Chikugo may refer to:

 Chikugo, Fukuoka, a city in Fukuoka Prefecture, Japan
 Chikugo Province, a former province of Japan
 Chikugo River, a river in Northern Kyushu, Japan
 Chikugo-class destroyer escort

See also